Ullrich Haupt  (October 15, 1915 – November 22, 1991) was an American-born German actor. His father, also named Ullrich Haupt, was a German actor who worked in Hollywood films, but he returned to Germany following his father's death in 1931.

Selected filmography
 The Comedians (1941) - Komödiant bei der Neuberin
 Alarmstufe V (1941) - Leutnant der Feuerschutzpolizei
 Dreaming (1944) - Johannes Brahms
 Kamerad Hedwig (1945) - Erich König
 Der Scheiterhaufen (1945)
 Die Kreuzlschreiber (1950) - Bauernbursche (uncredited)
 The Angel Who Pawned Her Harp (1959) - Hinrich Prigge
 Homesick for St. Pauli (1963) - Bob Hartau
 Die Rechnung – eiskalt serviert (1966) - George Davis
 Spy Today, Die Tomorrow (1967) - General Forman 
 Wegen Reichtum geschlossen (1968)
 Madam Kitty (1976) - Professor
 Derrick (Kein schöner Sonntag, 1976; Lissas Vater, 1978) - Herr Schirmer / Georg Hassler
 Target (1985) - Older Agent
 Escape from Sobibor (1987) - Sgt. Wolf
 Spider's Web (1989) - Baron von Köckwitz

References

External links
 

1915 births
1991 deaths
German male film actors
Male actors from Chicago
20th-century American male actors
20th-century German male actors
American emigrants to Germany